George Bertram (15 January 1896 – April 1963) was an English professional footballer who played in the Football League for Fulham, Brentford and Rotherham County as a forward or half back.

Career statistics

References

1896 births
English footballers
English Football League players
Brentford F.C. players
Durham City A.F.C. players
Fulham F.C. players
Sittingbourne F.C. players
Rotherham County F.C. players
Wrexham A.F.C. players
1963 deaths
Leadgate Park F.C. players
Oswestry Town F.C. players
Association football wing halves
Middlesbrough F.C. wartime guest players
Gateshead A.F.C. wartime guest players
People from Brandon, County Durham
Footballers from County Durham